In reptiles, the nasorostral is an enlarged and usually paired scale, just behind the rostral (and in front of the nasal scale).

Related scales
 Rostral scale
 Nasal scale

See also
 Snake scales

References

Snake scales